|}

This is a list of House of Assembly results for the 1950 Tasmanian election.

Results by division

Bass

Darwin

Denison

Franklin

Wilmot

See also 

 1950 Tasmanian state election
 Members of the Tasmanian House of Assembly, 1950–1955
 Candidates of the 1950 Tasmanian state election

References 

Results of Tasmanian elections
1950 in Australia